Flat Island, also known as Patag Island (Mandarin), is the second smallest of the natural Spratly Islands.

It is the sixth largest of the Philippine-occupied Spratly islands and is administered by the Philippines as part of Kalayaan, Palawan. The island is also claimed by the People's Republic of China, the Republic of China (Taiwan), and Vietnam.

Environment
The island is a low, flat, sandy cay, and is subject to erosion. It changes its shape seasonally. The sand build up depends largely on the direction of prevailing winds and waves; it has taken an elongated shape for some years, the shape of a crescent moon for a few years, and the shape of a letter "S". Like Lankiam Cay, it is barren of any vegetation. No underground water source has been found in the area.

Philippine Occupation
Presently, the island serves as a military observation outpost and is guarded by Philippine soldiers stationed at nearby Lawak Island. The soldiers regularly visit the island, and it is kept under observation from a tall structure on Lawak Island.

In August 2011, the Philippine Navy Seabees (Naval Combat Engineer Brigade) finished construction of a second star shell-like structure which is intended to shelter and protect troops.

The Philippine Coast Guard constructed 5 lighthouses in the area, and this includes one on Flat Island.

See also
Spratly Islands Dispute
Policies, activities and history of the Philippines in Spratly Islands

References

External links

Asia Maritime Transparency Initiative Island Tracker
Google Map of Flat Island
Photo of Flat Island showing two structures with Lawak Island in the background

Islands of the Spratly Islands
Kalayaan, Palawan